Håkon Mjøen (born 5 November 1944) is a Norwegian alpine skier. He was born in Oppdal. He participated at the 1968 Winter Olympics in Grenoble, where he competed in slalom and giant slalom.

He became Norwegian champion in slalom in 1966, 1967 and 1970, in giant slalom in 1966,1967 and 1968, and in alpine combined in 1966 and 1967.

References

External links

1944 births
Living people
People from Sør-Trøndelag
People from Oppdal
Norwegian male alpine skiers
Olympic alpine skiers of Norway
Alpine skiers at the 1968 Winter Olympics
Sportspeople from Trøndelag